Personal defense weapons (PDWs) are a class of firearms which fire a small-caliber (less than ), centerfire bottleneck cartridge resembling a scaled-down intermediate rifle cartridge, essentially making them an "in-between" hybrid between a submachine gun and a carbine.

The use of these rifle-like cartridges gives the PDWs much better ballistic performance (effective range, accuracy and armor-penetrating capability) than conventional submachine guns, which fire larger-caliber but slower and less aerodynamic handgun cartridges. The low recoil of these "sub-intermediate" cartridges also makes muzzle rise on PDWs (which typically have short gun barrels) much easier to handle than short-barreled rifles, especially when shooting full-auto or in burst fire.

The name describes the weapon's original conceptual role: as a compact but powerful small arm that can be conveniently carried for personal defense, usually by support personnel behind the front line such as military engineers, logistic drivers, medical specialists, artillery crews or signallers. These "second-line" personnel are not strictly combat troops expected to directly engage the enemy, but may still be at risk of encountering decently equipped (and often well-armored) hostile skirmishers and infiltrators, therefore having to defend themselves in close quarters. Such encounters will warrant an effective weapon that is easy to use while having sufficient firepower to suppress enemy charges and hold them beyond a safe perimeter to prevent the defenders from being overrun, but the risk of hostility is rare enough that a standard service rifle would be an unnecessary burden during their normal duties.

Because of their light weight, controllability, ease of operation and close-range effectiveness (can defeat a NATO CRISAT vest or an NIJ IIIA soft Kevlar armor at up to ), PDWs have also been used by special forces, paramilitaries, heavily armed tactical police and even bodyguards.

History

In the 19th and early 20th centuries, shortened versions of the infantry rifle were issued as "carbines" for cavalry troops and gun crews. This designation was dropped as infantry rifle designs became shortened overall, such as in the Short Magazine Lee–Enfield rifle. Thereafter, handguns were typically issued as self-defense weapons. However, they were not effective in most close combat situations. As a result, during the First World War, the Mauser C96 and artillery versions of the Luger pistol were issued with attachable shoulder stock holsters, which allowed for greater control and accuracy.

During World War I, the United States secretly developed the Pedersen device attachment for the M1903 Springfield rifle that allowed it to fire a .30 caliber (7.62 mm) pistol-type cartridge in semi-automatic mode. This attachment was developed to allow an infantryman to convert "his rifle to a form of submachine gun or automatic rifle" in approximately 15 seconds.

Production of the device and modified M1903 rifles started in 1918. However, the war ended before they were sent to Europe. The contract was cancelled on March 1, 1919, after production of 65,000 devices, 1.6 million magazines, 65 million cartridges and 101,775 modified Springfield rifles. The Pedersen device was declared surplus in 1931. To prevent them from falling into the hands of the lawless, nearly all of the stored devices were destroyed by the Army except for a few examples kept by Ordnance Department.

In 1938, the U.S. Army Ordnance Department received a request for a light rifle to be issued to mortarmen, radiomen, drivers, clerks, cooks, and similar grades. During field exercises, these troops found that the M1 Garand rifle was too heavy and too cumbersome for general issue. And, while handguns are undeniably convenient, they had limited range, accuracy and power. This request was refused by authorities.

In 1940, after Germany's use of glider-borne and paratroop forces to infiltrate and attack strategic points behind the front lines, the request for a light rifle was resubmitted and subsequently approved. U.S. Army Ordnance issued a requirement for a "light rifle" with greater range, firepower, and accuracy than the M1911 pistol while weighing half as much as the M1 Garand. As a result, the U.S. developed the semi-automatic M1 Carbine and shortly thereafter the select-fire M2 Carbine. Widely employed until the end of the Vietnam War, these carbines are generally considered the forerunners of modern personal defense weapons.

Developed during the 1980s, the "Personal Defense Weapon" (PDW) concept was created in response to a NATO request as a replacement for 9×19mm Parabellum submachine guns. The PDW is a compact automatic weapon that can defeat enemy body armor and which can be used conveniently by non-combatant and support troops, as well as a close quarters battle weapon for special forces and counter-terrorist groups.

Introduced in 1991, the FN P90 features a bullpup design with a futuristic appearance. It has a 50-round magazine housed horizontally above the barrel, an integrated reflex sight and fully ambidextrous controls. A simple blow-back automatic weapon, it was designed to fire the FN 5.7×28mm cartridge which can penetrate soft body armor. The P90 was designed to have a length no greater than a man's shoulder width, to allow it to be easily carried and maneuvered in tight spaces, such as the inside of an armored vehicle.

Introduced in 2001, the Heckler & Koch MP7 is a direct rival to the FN P90. Featuring a more conventional-looking design, the MP7 uses a short-stroke piston gas system as used on H&K's G36 and HK416 assault rifles, in place of a blowback system traditionally seen on submachine guns. The MP7 is able to use 20-, 30- and 40-round magazines and fires 4.6×30mm ammunition which can penetrate soft body armor. Due to the heavy use of polymers in its construction, the MP7 is much lighter than older SMG designs, weighing only  with an empty 20-round magazine.

Applications

The PDW concept has not been widely successful, partly because existing PDWs are not significantly cheaper to manufacture than carbines or full-size military rifles. Most PDWs also use a proprietary cartridge, such as the 5.7×28mm cartridge for the FN P90 or the 4.6×30mm for the H&K MP7, neither of which were originally compatible with any existing pistols or rifles/carbines. Although both manufacturers planned handguns that used the same proprietary rounds, only FN went forward with production of the Five-SeveN pistol, which was the only handgun option available for the 5.7×28mm cartridge for over two decades until the introduction of Ruger-57 in 2019. In turn, this made the PDW cartridges expensive to consumers due to the lack of mass production. A different take on the PDW concept is the Russian-made PP-2000, which can fire common 9×19mm Parabellum ammunition or a special high-pressure armor-piercing variant to give it similar capabilities as other PDWs.

Though personal defense weapons have not been very popular for their intended application, they have been acquired by many special forces and law enforcement groups as direct upgrade for submachine guns. The FN P90 and Five-seven pistol are used by military and police forces in over 40 countries throughout the world, including Canada, Cyprus, France, Greece, India, Peru, Poland, Spain and the United States. The Heckler & Koch MP7 is also used in a number of countries, including Austria, France, Germany, Ireland, Norway, Malaysia and the United Kingdom.

Modern PDW cartridge 
 FN 5.7×28mm
 HK 4.6×30mm
 5.8×21mm DAP
 4.38×30mm Libra
 6.5×25mm CBJ
 5.56×30mm MINSAS
 7.5 FK

Personal defense weapons
 AAC Honey Badger PDW – .300 AAC Blackout (7.62×35mm)
 AKS-74U – 5.45×39mm
 Amogh carbine – 5.56×30mm MINSAS
 AR-57 – 5.7×28mm – M16 lower receiver with a redesigned upper receiver fed by FN P90 magazines
 Barrett REC7 PDW – 6.8mm Remington SPC (6.8×43mm)
 Brügger & Thomet MP9 – 6.5×25mm CBJ & 9×19mm Luger 
 Colt MARS – 5.56×30mm MARS
ČZW-438 – 4.38×30mm Libra
 FN P90 – 5.7×28mm
 FN SCAR PDW – 5.56×45mm NATO
 FN SCAR SC – 5.56×45mm NATO & .300 AAC Blackout (7.62×35mm) – A new variant of the FN SCAR, with a .300 Blackout chambering kit released in late 2018.
 GA Personal Defense Weapon – 7.62×37mm Musang
Gepard (SMG) – 9×30mm "Grom"
Heckler & Koch MP5K-PDW – 9×19mm
 Heckler & Koch MP7 – 4.6×30mm
 Knight's Armament Company PDW – 6×35mm KAC
 Magpul PDR – 5.56×45mm NATO
Modern Sub Machine Carbine – 5.56×30mm MINSAS
 PP-2000 – 9×19mm 7N21 +P+, 9×19mm 7N31 +P+
 QCW-05 – 5.8×21mm
 Saab Bofors Dynamics CBJ-MS – 6.5×25mm
 ST Kinetics CPW – 4.6×30mm, 5.7×28mm, 9×19mm
 VBR-Belgium PDW – 7.92×24mm
 CMMG FourSix – 4.6×30mm

PDW-caliber handguns

 FK BRNO – 7.5FK
FN Five-seven – 5.7×28mm
Kel-Tec P50 – 5.7×28mm
 MPA57 – 5.7×28mm
 QSZ-92 / QSW-06 – 5.8×21mm
Ruger-57 – 5.7×28mm
VBR-Belgium CQBW – 4.6×30mm, 5.7×28mm, 7.92×24mm

See also
 Assault rifle
 Assault weapon
 Automatic shotgun

References

 
Firearms